Grundorf Corporation is an American loudspeaker manufacturer / road case company headquartered in Council Bluffs, Iowa, USA.

History 
Grundorf Corporation was formed in 1984 to manufacture and repair audio equipment for regional and touring musicians. As the business grew, audio companies such as Celestion began using Grundorf to design and build their systems.

As Grundorf continued its focus on Protective Case sales, a growing demand from touring groups like Mannheim Steamroller for sophisticated, application-specific audio systems kept the company occupied.

Eventually, two complementary divisions were formed: Grund Audio Design and Grundorf Case & Accessory.

Grund Audio Design Division
GAD audio engineers use multiple techniques including LEAP, LMS, Thiele/Small parameters and industry audiophiles for critical listening tests. GAD systems employ materials including asymmetrical horns; Neodymium magnets; Titanium drivers; full-protection circuitry; Baltic Birch wood and third-order crossover networks to precisely match transition between drivers.

Grundorf Case and Accessory Division
Grundorf Cases are built for applications where portability and mobility are of prime importance. Their designs are used in educational facilities, corporate A/V, lighting, musicians, rental, DJ and “Pro-Audio” production companies.

References

Containers
Loudspeaker manufacturers
Manufacturers of professional audio equipment
Electronics companies established in 1984
Audio equipment manufacturers of the United States